Mitino is a Moscow Metro station in the Mitino District, North-Western Administrative Okrug, Moscow. It is located on the Arbatsko-Pokrovskaya Line between Volokolamskaya and Pyatnitskoye Shosse. Mitino opened on 26 December 2009.

References

Moscow Metro stations
Railway stations in Russia opened in 2009
Arbatsko-Pokrovskaya Line
Railway stations located underground in Russia